The Miran tribe is one of the Kurdish tribes who was a part of the Chokhsor confederation. The tribe eventually came to dominate the others of the tribal confederation for a period of time after the demise of Cizre Botan.

History 
According to the British Consul for Kurdistan, the Miran tribe was, "though not the largest, one of the most influential and richest tribes in the area around the highlands to south of Lake Van." Bedirhan Bey had to incorporate the tribe to be a part of his emirate by force. Upon the defeat of Bedirhans by the Ottomans, some Miran chiefs were contenders for the principal authority of Cizre Botan. The tribe was nomadic and in the winter season was in the area around Mosul, in spring travelled to the town of Cizre to engage in their annual trade, and in summer he was at the Van Lake.

Mustafa Pasha of the Miran
In the 1890s, the Miran tribe's Agha was made a Pasha by Sultan Abdul Hamid II and thus became the only chieftain in the former emirate of Cizre Botan who was an entitled Pasha. The Miran tribe also contributed regiments to the Hamidiye cavalry.

The First World War
The Miran tribe served the Ottoman Empire and was deployed all the way into Bulgaria.

References

Kurdish tribes